Shoaymit or Shoeymet or Shoaymat or Shoameyt may refer to:
 Shoaymat 1
 Shoaymat 2
 Shoaymat 3
 Shoaymit-e Jaber
 Shoaymit-e Mandil